V392 Persei, also known as Nova Persei 2018, is a bright nova in the constellation Perseus discovered on April 29, 2018.  It was previously known as a dwarf nova.

Dwarf nova
A U Geminorum-type variable star or dwarf nova is a type of cataclysmic variable star consisting of a close binary star system in which one of the components is a white dwarf that accretes matter from a cool main sequence or subgiant companion.  V392 Persei was discovered in 1970 and received its variable star designation a year later.  It is normally visual magnitude 17.4 and experiences outbursts of 2-3 magnitudes.  Its spectrum in the quiescent state has been studied and only the cool star is detected.  The spectrum shows emission lines of hydrogen-alpha (Hα) and both neutral and ionised helium.  The brightest recorded observations is at magnitude 5.6.

Nova eruption

On April 29, 2018 it was discovered by Yuji Nakamura to be extremely bright, and it was spectroscopically confirmed as a nova outburst with magnitude 6.2 on April 30.  The spectrum includes broad Hα and FeII emission lines with P Cygni profiles.  The absorption core is blueshifted by a velocity of 2,680 km/s, which would be the expansion velocity from the nova explosion.

Observations with Fermi-LAT on April 30 show a strong gamma-ray source at the coordinates of the nova.  Photometry of the nova from Konkoly Observatory on May 1, 2018 give apparent magnitudes of 7.38 in the V band and 8.22 in the B band, suggesting it is already declining.

System
V392 Persei is the southern of a pair of stars separated by 8.5".

The symbiotic pair are unresolved, with an orbital period of only 3.21997 days, and the nature of the cool component is unclear.  The spectral energy distribution is inconsistent with a bright giant star but it could be less luminous red clump giant or subgiant.  If the cool component was a main sequence red dwarf as expected for a dwarf nova, then the system would need to be closer than the  suggested by its Gaia parallax.

Gallery

See also
 List of novae in the Milky Way galaxy

References

External links
Dwarf Nova V392 Persei Goes Big — It’s Now Binocular Bright
How A Dwarf Nova Hit The Big Time May 2, 2018
Nova in Perseus
V392 Per in outburst, showing spectra of the nova in outburst and previously

Novae
20180430
Perseus (constellation)
Persei, V392
Dwarf novae
J04432138+4721257
Double stars